Valley Park Woodlands is a   Local Nature Reserve in Chandler's Ford in Hampshire. It is owned and managed by Test Valley Borough Council.

This site has ancient woods, coppice, glades, woodland rides, rough grassland and ponds.

References

Local Nature Reserves in Hampshire